Kunjen, or Uw, is a Paman language spoken on the Cape York Peninsula of Queensland, Australia, by the Uw Oykangand, Olkola, and related Aboriginal Australian peoples. It is closely related to Kuuk Thaayorre, and perhaps Kuuk Yak.

Two of its dialects, Uw Olkola (Olgolo) and Uw Oykangand (Koko Wanggara), are very close, being mutually intelligible and sharing 97% of their core vocabulary.
Another two, Ogh-Undjan and Kawarrangg, are also close, but somewhat more distant from the first pair.  Kokinj (Kokiny) is a subdialect of Ogh-Undjan.  A fifth variety, Athima, is poorly attested.

Below is a table showing the mutual intelligibility in vocabulary between the Kunjen dialects, based on a list of 100 basic words.

A small dictionary of Kunjen has been compiled by Philip Hamilton. A great majority of words begin with a vowel (>96%), similar to the situation in distantly-related Arrernte. Exceptions include kinship terms and loanwords. Syllable onsets are thought to be present in all languages, so their absence in native lexicon is highly notable.

Respect register 
As in many other Australian languages, such as Dyirbal, Kunjen also has a respect register, which is a polite way of speaking with a potential mother-in-law and is called Olkel-Ilmbanhthi. Most of the vocabulary is replaced, while affixes and function words are kept.

The sentence below is in normal Uw Oykangand:

 Alka-nhdh idu-rr ay
 spear- spear- I
 "I speared it with a spear"

The equivalent in Olkel-Ilmbanhthi is:

 Udnga-nhdh yanganyunyja-rr ay
 spear- spear- I
 "I speared it with a spear"

Phonology

Vowels 
Kunjen has 5 vowels:

There is a lexical vowel harmony constraint in Kunjen: Close and mid vowels do not co-occur in a word.

Consonants 
Kunjen has 27 consonants:

In popular culture 
The Uw Olkola word for the freshwater crocodile, ogakor, was used as the name of a tribe on the second season of the American reality television series, Survivor in 2001.

References 

 Sommer, Bruce A. 1969. Kunjen phonology: synchronic and diachronic. (Pacific Linguistics: Series B, Monographs, 11.) Canberra: Australian Natl. Univ. 76pp.
 Uw Olkola and Uw Oykangand Language Information

Southwestern Paman languages
Endangered indigenous Australian languages in Queensland
Severely endangered languages